Ernest Harold Pearce  (23 July 1865 – 28 October 1930) was an Anglican bishop, the 106th bishop of Worcester from 1919 until his death.

Biography
He was born on 23 July 1865 and was educated at Christ's Hospital and Peterhouse, Cambridge. Ordained priest in 1890 he was firstly an assistant master and school chaplain at Christ's Hospital. An eminent scholar, he was Professor of Biblical History at Queen's College, London until 1905 when he became Rector of Christ Church Greyfriars in the City of London. Treasurer then Archdeacon of Westminster, he was subsequently elevated to the See of Diocese of Worcester. A cleric whose efficiency, powers of rapid work and precision of thought were respected throughout the church. He died suddenly on 28 October 1930 aged 65.

Works
The Annals of Christ's Hospital, 1901
The Book of God's Kingdom, 1902
The Sons of the Clergy, 1904
English Christianity in its Beginnings, 1908
The Laws of the Earliest Gospel, 1913
William de Colchester, 1915
The Monks of Westminster, 1916
The Royal Hospitals at Church, 1925
The Register of Thomas de Cobham, 1317-1327, 1930

Notes

External links
 
 

1865 births
1930 deaths
People educated at Christ's Hospital
Alumni of Peterhouse, Cambridge
Bishops of Worcester
Archdeacons of Westminster
20th-century Church of England bishops
Honorary Chaplains to the Queen
Commanders of the Order of the British Empire
Royal Army Chaplains' Department officers
British Army personnel of World War I
Canons of Westminster